Fairfield USD 310 is a public unified school district headquartered about 1 mile north of Langdon, Kansas, United States. The district includes the communities of Abbyville, Arlington, Huntsville, Langdon, Lerado, Plevna, Sylvia, Turon, and nearby rural areas.

Schools
The school district headquarters and the following schools are all located within the same school grounds.
 Fairfield High School
 Fairfield Middle School
 Fairfield Elementary School

See also
 Kansas State Department of Education
 Kansas State High School Activities Association
 List of high schools in Kansas
 List of unified school districts in Kansas

References

External links
 

School districts in Kansas